National Route 27 is a national highway in South Korea connects Goheung County to Gunsan. It established on 22 February 1972.

Main stopovers
South Jeolla Province
 Goheung County - Boseong County - Suncheon - Gokseong County
North Jeolla Province
 Sunchang County - Imsil County - Wanju County (Gui-myeon)- Jeonju (Wansan-gu) - Wanju County (Iseo-myeon) - Jeonju (Wansan-gu) - Wanju County (Iseo-myeon) - Jeonju (Deokjin-gu) - Wanju County (Samrye-eup) - Iksan - Gunsan

Major intersections

 (■): Motorway
IS: Intersection, IC: Interchange

South Jeolla Province

North Jeolla Province

References

27
Roads in South Jeolla
Roads in North Jeolla